Claudia and David is an American old-time radio drama. One version was broadcast on CBS July 4, 1941 - September 26, 1941 and another was syndicated in 1947.

Background
Claudia and David was first heard on radio in a segment on the June 6, 1941, episode of The Kate Smith Hour. At that time, Claudia had just fallen in love with David. When Smith's program went off for the summer, the 10-minute segments were expanded to fill her time slot. The couple's wedding occurred on the July 11, 1941, episode.

The characters first appeared in 10 short stories by Rose Franken that were published in Redbook magazine from October 1938 through August 1939. Claudia, the Story of a Marriage, a book that included those stories and additional material, was published in 1939. It was followed by other books about the couple.

Premise
The program focused on the lives of David and Claudia Naughton, a young married couple. At 18, Claudia's close ties to her mother threatened the future of her marriage to David. The couple also had to deal with financial problems, getting used to each other, and other adjustments typical of a new marriage. In the first episode, David's life was threatened by a sudden illness, resulting in increased tension between David's mother and the rest of the family, while it strengthened the bonds among David, Claudia, and her mother.

General Foods was the sponsor, promoting Grape-Nuts and Grape-Nuts Flakes.

Personnel
The program's actors and the characters that they portrayed are shown in the table below.

Source: Radio Programs, 1924-1984: A Catalog of More Than 1800 Shows

Joe King was the announcer, and Peter van Steeden provided the music.

Syndicated version
Claudia and David was brought back to radio in 1947 with a new cast, a new sponsor, and a new means of distribution. Katharine Bard and Paul Crabtree played Claudia and David, and Peggy Allenby played Mrs. Brown. The program was sponsored by Coca-Cola and distributed via Electrical transcription. It originated at WGN in Chicago.

References

External links

Logs
 Log of episodes from Jerry Haendiges Vintage Radio Logs 
 Log of episodes from Old Time Radio Researchers Group
 Log of episodes from radioGOLDINdex

Streaming
 Episodes from Internet Archive

1941 radio programme debuts
1941 radio programme endings
CBS Radio programs
1940s American radio programs
American radio dramas
Radio programs adapted into television shows